Deats is a surname. Notable people with the surname include:

 Danyi Deats (born 1967), American film actor and producer
 Hiram Deats (1810–1887), American agricultural equipment manufacturer
 Hiram Edmund Deats (1870–1963), American historian and philatelist
 John Deats (1769–1841), American wheelwright and inventor of the Deats plow

See also
 Deetz
 Deitz
 Dietz